Dominique Esnault (born 18 January 1959) is a French sport shooter. She competed in rifle shooting events at the 1984 Summer Olympics, the 1988 Summer Olympics and the 1992 Summer Olympics.

Olympic results

References

1959 births
Living people
ISSF rifle shooters
French female sport shooters
Shooters at the 1984 Summer Olympics
Shooters at the 1988 Summer Olympics
Shooters at the 1992 Summer Olympics
Olympic shooters of France
Sportspeople from Versailles, Yvelines